June-Young Soh (born 15 January 1965) is a South Korean director/musician who made his worldwide debut in Shanghai Mercedes-Benz Arena with the musical The Lost Garden on 8 June 2013. His current work, 'CHASA', is a circus based musical the story of which was derived from the old Korean myth; 'Chasa Bonpuri'.

Born and raised in Seoul, he became involved in rock music as a teenager; experiences in his first band, 'Since & Hence', has led him to become a professional musician in the later years. He became a professor at Seoul Institute of the Arts in his late 20s and released his first album with Warner Music Korea in 1993. It was not until 1996, he released his second album with Sony Music Korea. He released his third album, 'The paradise market' in April 2017. His contemporary singles can be found in various online music stores. 

He was involved in a number of exhibition productions earlier in his career including Taejŏn Expo '93 and Expo '98 where he worked as the composer/sound director of the main film of the pavilion. He established his 3D surround sound technics working in the pavilion environments during those early years. He further developed his ideas of 3D sound when he became the director of music and sound for the Korean pavilion of the Lisbon World Expo in 1998. His experimental 12.3 surround sound was best represented in the main film of the pavilion, 'Pearl Sea'; an underwater story of a woman diver in Jeju island.

References

External links
The Lost Garden
CHASA

1965 births
Living people
Musicians from Seoul